In Sikhism, Prashad (Punjabi: ਕੜਾਹ ਪ੍ਰਸਾਦ ) is a type of whole wheat flour halva made with equal portions of whole-wheat flour, clarified butter, and sugar and double quantity of water. It is offered to all visitors to the Darbar Sahib in a Gurdwara. It is regarded as a treat for attendees of gurmat seminars. As a sign of humanity and respect, visitors accept the Prashad sitting, with hands raised and cupped. The offering and receiving of this food is a vital part of hospitality protocols. It has the same amount of whole-wheat flour, clarified butter and sugar, to emphasize the equality of men and women. The Sewadar serves it out of the same bowl to everyone in equal portions. The Karah prasad is a sacred food; if it is not accepted, it may be interpreted by some Sikhs as an insult. Prashad is also taken at the initiation ceremony of Amrit Sanchar at the very end where it is shared out equally among all. It is a symbol showing that everyone is equal.

The Gurdwara is the place where Sikhs go to worship. Gurdwaras can be any size or shape, but one thing they always have is a kitchen, or langar. People can go there for food, and can even rest there for the night. Every day a meal is prepared here for as many people who want to eat, always for free.

References

Sikh terminology
Religious food and drink
Confectionery